Alef or aleph is the first letter of the Semitic abjads.

Alef may also refer to:

People
Alef Poh-ji (born 1987), Thai football player
Alef (footballer, born 1993), Alef Vieira Santos, Brazilian football centre-back
Alef (footballer, born 1995), Alef dos Santos Saldanha, Brazilian football midfielder

Other uses
Alef (programming language)
Alef Aeronautics (flying car company)
Alef Bank, a bank in Russia
Degania Alef, a kibbutz in northern Israel
HAT-P-9b or Alef, an exoplanet
Liga Alef, the third tier of the Israeli football league
Masada: Alef, sometimes simply Alef, album by John Zorn
Alef. taxonomic author abbreviation in botany for Friedrich Alefeld

See also
Aleph (disambiguation)